Reußendorf may refer to:

 a family line of the Bohemian branch established by Anton of the House of Schaffgotsch
 the former German name for Raszów, Poland
 the former German name for Rusinowa, Poland